Inseparable may refer to:

Mathematics
 Inseparable differential equation, an ordinary differential equation that cannot be solved by using separation of variables
 Inseparable extension, a field extension by elements that do not all satisfy a separable polynomial
 Inseparable polynomial, a polynomial that does not have distinct roots in a splitting field

Music
 Inseparable (album), by Natalie Cole, 1975
 "Inseparable" (song), the title song
 Inseparable (EP), by Veridia, 2014
 Les inséparables, an album by Corneille, 2011
 "Inseperable", a song by Jonas Brothers from Jonas Brothers, 2007
 "Inseperable", a song by Mariah Carey from Memoirs of an Imperfect Angel, 2009

Other uses
 Inseparable (book), a 2019 sports autobiography by Shaquem Griffin and Shaquill Griffin, with Mark Schlabach
 Inseparable (film), a 2011 Chinese film by Dayyan Eng
 The Inseparables, a 1929 British film by Adelqui Migliar and John Stafford
  Inseparability, in marketing, a quality of services as distinct from goods